There are eighty-one suburbs in the City of Gold Coast, a local government area in Queensland, Australia. The local government area has been amended several times since its creation in 1948, most dramatically by its amalgamation in 1994 with the Shire of Albert, and losing a section centred on Beenleigh north of the Albert River to Logan City in March 2008.

Fifty-two are gazetted as suburbs and twenty-nine as localities. Many suburbs have been established on reclaimed land including saltmarshes, mangroves and tidal flats. Some of these suburbs have developed extensive canal waterways. There are many shopping centres on the Gold Coast.

Suburbs

Former suburbs

Notes

References
General references

 
 

Inline references

Cited bibliography

 
 
 
 
 
 
 May, S., Queensland Place Names Cutting Book, John Oxley Library, August 1958.

External links
 

Gold Coast
Gold Coast suburbs